Palaniappa Gounder Kumarasamy is an Indian politician and former Member of Parliament elected from Tamil Nadu. He was elected to the Lok Sabha from erstwhile Palani constituency as an Anna Dravida Munnetra Kazhagam candidate in 1992 by-election and 1999 election.

References 

All India Anna Dravida Munnetra Kazhagam politicians
Living people
India MPs 1991–1996
India MPs 1999–2004
Lok Sabha members from Tamil Nadu
People from Dindigul district
Year of birth missing (living people)